Arthur William Wilde (1879 – 21 January 1916) was a British sports shooter. He competed in three events at the 1908 Summer Olympics. He was killed in action during World War I.

See also
 List of Olympians killed in World War I

References

1879 births
1916 deaths
British male sport shooters
Olympic shooters of Great Britain
Shooters at the 1908 Summer Olympics
Place of birth missing
British military personnel killed in World War I